"Norrsken (Goeksegh)" is a song by Swedish singer Jon Henrik Fjällgren. The song was performed for the first time in Melodifestivalen 2019, where it made it to the final. This was his third entry in the Melodifestivalen.

Charts

References

2019 singles
Swedish songs
Melodifestivalen songs of 2019
Swedish pop songs
Songs written by Fredrik Kempe
Songs written by David Kreuger
2019 songs